Charles of Scotland  may refer to:

 Charles I of Scotland (1600–1649), King of England, Scotland, and Ireland
 Charles II of Scotland (1630–1685), King of England, Scotland, and Ireland
 Charles Edward Stuart (1720–1788), Stuart claimant to the thrones of England, Scotland and Ireland